is a Japanese video game director and game designer best known as the creator of the Kirby and Super Smash Bros. series. Apart from his work on those series, he also led the design of Meteos in 2005 and directed Kid Icarus: Uprising in 2012.

Formerly an employee of HAL Laboratory, he left the company in 2003 and in 2005 with his wife Michiko Sakurai (also ex-HAL Laboratory), they founded , a shell company that works on a freelance basis on several projects. He was also an author of a weekly column for Famitsu magazine for decades until the 2020s, and has done voice acting work in some of his games, most notably providing the voice of King Dedede in Kirby 64: The Crystal Shards and the Super Smash Bros. series.

Career
Masahiro Sakurai was born on August 3, 1970, in Musashimurayama, Tokyo, Japan. One of Sakurai's earliest experiences in the video game industry began when he worked for HAL Laboratory, where he created the character Kirby at age 19 and directed his first title, Kirby's Dream Land.

Sakurai left HAL on August 5, 2003, after growing tired of the sequelization passively forced by HAL, ending his work on the Kirby series. "It was tough for me to see that every time I made a new game, people automatically assumed that a sequel was coming," Sakurai commented, in an interview with Nintendo Dream, two weeks after he resigned from HAL. He explained that, "even if it's a sequel, lots of people have to give their all to make a game, but some people think the sequel process happens naturally".

Soon after, Sakurai began working on a project with Q Entertainment, along with Tetsuya Mizuguchi. This collaboration resulted in Meteos in 2005, a puzzle game for the Nintendo DS. On September 30, 2005, Sakurai announced that he had formed his own company, Sora Ltd. Two titles were announced to be in development but no information on the titles had been divulged. As for the future of the Super Smash Bros. series, Nintendo and HAL Laboratory's President Satoru Iwata, during Nintendo's E3 2005 press conference, promised an online iteration of the game would come to Nintendo's video game console Wii.

In issue #885 of Famitsu magazine, Sakurai revealed that he would be serving as a director and game designer on Super Smash Bros. Brawl for the Wii. Super Smash Bros. Brawl was released in 2008, after personnel borrowed from 19 different developer studios assisted in development. Sakurai had been updating daily the Super Smash Bros Brawl website called the Smash Bros. Dojo. Starting a year previous the release, he revealed Brawl secrets and gameplay content through the site. The Smash Bros. Dojo had regular updates from May 22, 2007, to April 14, 2008.

On the final day of updates, it was revealed that Sakurai provided the voice for King Dedede in Kirby 64: The Crystal Shards as well as Dedede in Super Smash Bros. Brawl. He and his company, Sora Ltd. alongside Nintendo, started a first-party studio, Project Sora, which was 72% owned by Nintendo and 28% owned by Sora Ltd. It was revealed at E3 2010 that Sakurai and Project Sora were working on Kid Icarus: Uprising for the Nintendo 3DS. Project Sora was closed and ended development on June 30, 2012. At E3 2011, Nintendo announced that Sakurai was working on Super Smash Bros. for Nintendo 3DS and Wii U. Sakurai began development of the title upon the release of Kid Icarus: Uprising in March 2012.

In February 2013, Sakurai was diagnosed with calcific tendinitis near his right shoulder, which caused him substantial pain whenever he moved his arm. He mentioned that this could effectively slow down his work, as he does some of his game testing himself. Sakurai's wife, Michiko, has worked on the graphical user interface for many of his games, including Kirby Air Ride, Meteos, and the Super Smash Bros. series.

In a January 2015 column in Weekly Famitsu, Sakurai alluded to the possibility of retirement, expressing doubt that he would be able to continue making games if his career continued to be as stressful as it was. In December 2015, Sakurai once again stated that he was not sure if there would be another game in the Smash Bros. series, prior to Super Smash Bros. Ultimate being released in 2018 with Sakurai once again as director.

On March 14, 2022, Sakurai was awarded Best Creator by Weekly Famitsu. Sakurai also announced that he is working on a new project not related to game production.

Masahiro Sakurai on Creating Games

On August 23, 2022, Sakurai launched his own YouTube channel in both English and Japanese, titled Masahiro Sakurai on Creating Games. According to Sakurai, the channel's videos will be focused on "topics like game development and what makes games fun", as well as discussing his history as a game designer and director. He also stated that the channel was founded because he wanted to reach more people with his lessons after being asked to lecture at schools. Sakurai additionally noted that other venues for game design lessons from game developers, such as the Game Developer's Conference, focused on more advanced, technical details, rather than more basic principles. Less than 24 hours after its launch, the English edition of his channel gained over 200,000 subscribers. Since then, he has discussed topics such as "risk and reward", frame rates, lighting, and more.

Works

Notes

References

External links
 
 

1970 births
Japanese YouTubers
Japanese video game designers
Japanese video game directors
Kirby (series)
Living people
Nintendo people
People from Musashimurayama, Tokyo
Super Smash Bros.